Apostasy is the formal disaffiliation from, or abandonment or renunciation of, a religion by a person. 
 Apostasy in Christianity
 Apostasy in Islam
 Apostasy in Judaism

Apostasy  may also refer to:
 Apostasia of 1965 (Apostasy of 1965), often called the Apostacy (Apostasia), a Greek coup
 Apostasy (1948 film), Japanese film by Keisuke Kinoshita
 Apostasy (2017 film), 2017 British drama film directed by Daniel Kokotajlo
 Apostasy (band), a Swedish black metal band
 The Apostasy, a 2007 album by Polish  band Behemoth

See also
 Apostate (disambiguation)
 Apostasia (disambiguation)